Benolong Parish  is a civil parish of Gordon County, New South Wales. a Cadastral divisions of New South Wales.

The  parish is on the Macquarie River and Whylandra Creek south of Dubbo, New South Wales, the nearest town.

The now disused Molong–Dubbo railway line passes through the parish with Nubingerie railway station in the parish.

References

Parishes of Gordon County (New South Wales)